The R. in R&B Collection, Vol. 1 is the first compilation album released by American R&B singer R. Kelly. The album has sold more than 3 million copies in the United States and 907,680 copies in United Kingdom.

Track listing

Charts

Weekly charts

Year-end charts

Certifications

References

R. Kelly albums
Albums produced by R. Kelly
2003 greatest hits albums